A community service officer (CSO) provides support in crime prevention, investigation, and response where full police powers are unnecessary and assists police officers in upholding law and order.

History
The concept has been in use in the United States since at least the 1970s. The United States Department of Justice database includes an article from 1977 entitled, COMBATING CRIME - FULL UTILIZATION OF THE POLICE OFFICER AND CSO (COMMUNITY SERVICE OFFICER) CONCEPT that described CSO functions and implementation of a CSO program. The program was not widely implemented until tight budgets collided with the public's demand for better response in emergency situations.

Characteristics
Most community service officers are specially or limited commissioned peace officers and some are non-sworn (civilian) positions without powers of arrest and most do not carry firearms due to liability issues. Some CSOs are authorized to carry less-lethal weapons such as tasers, batons or pepper spray, and do receive training in self-defense tactics. Many departments authorize their CSOs to issue traffic and civil infraction citations in the course of crash investigations. At some agencies, the first year of the job is primarily clerical, with little field work. The amount of training a CSO receives will vary by state, and even by the local jurisdiction within a state.

The current climate within larger police agencies is that they are becoming increasingly constrained because of budgetary concerns and the need to serve a larger or growing community. In this environment, the position of the CSO is considered a blessing for both the departments and communities they serve in. CSOs typically are paid significantly less than sworn officers, allowing departments to field more people for the same amount of money. This has the effect of providing quicker response times to citizen requests for police services. Further, CSOs usually handle low to medium priority calls which do not require an armed police officer with arrest powers freeing sworn officers to concentrate on those incidents requiring their specific skill set. Even a few CSOs can have a significant impact on the efficiency and effectiveness of police services that departments provide.

Most departments distinguish the CSO's from normal police officers in a variety of ways, however, the two most common are uniform and vehicle. Uniforms vary by department and should be recognizable to the public as police staff, but visibly distinct from regular police officers, examples being neon Yellow (similar to the color of some traffic vests), a lighter blue color, or in some cases white. Issued vehicles for Community Service Officers often identify the individual as a CSO via decals on the vehicle. The lighting on the CSO vehicles is also different, though the color combinations vary by department. Examples include amber only lights in Jacksonville, Fl., or red/amber colors in St. Johns County, Fl., while Orlando, Fl. uses police red and clear color lights. In some cases, the color green replaced the color blue. Some CSO vehicles are equipped with a single tone siren for responding to mutual aid requests by police officers. Vehicle type is also department and locale-specific. Jacksonville uses the Chevy Malibu and Chevy Impala, Orlando uses the Ford Crown Victoria and Chevy Impala, and St. Johns County utilizes the Chevy Impala, as well as different models of Pickup and Sport Utility vehicles for the CSO's.

In Jacksonville, Florida, the CSO is regarded as an entry-level position to law enforcement for high school graduates, because the department requires police officers to be at least 21 and have a bachelor's degree, or associate degree and four years of active military or law-enforcement experience. CSOs are expected to attend college (tuition is reimbursed) and apply to the police academy within five years.

The hiring process for CSO's is similar to the process of a sworn officer being hired in most departments. CSO's must undergo oral board reviews, polygraph tests, medical and psychological exams, writing skills tests, and background investigations. CSO's are also held to a higher standard than a sworn police officer.

Duties
 Airport security, mass public transit security and civil regulation enforcement
 Evidence collection and use of specialized forensic equipment
 Traffic control at vehicle collisions, public events, structure fires and traffic signal outages
 Traffic accident investigations
 Issue parking tickets
 Receives reports of and performs the initial investigation of burglaries, petty theft, found property, missing persons, vandalism and auto theft
 Provide emergency animal control
 Community Relations including crime prevention and responding to requests for information
 Dispatch
 Serves subpoenas
 Transports juveniles
 Respond to emergency vehicle breakdowns
 Assist school crossing guards
 Fingerprint services for citizens
 Vacation & Welfare Checks
 School Security
 Municipal Building Security

See also
 Police community support officer
 Community policing

References

External links
 International Association of Chiefs of Police, Community Service Officer concept

Communities
Law enforcement occupations
Law enforcement titles